Florence is an unincorporated community in the town of Pittsford, Rutland County, Vermont, United States.  A post office existed in Florence from 1882 to 1903.

References 

Pittsford, Vermont
Unincorporated communities in Rutland County, Vermont
Unincorporated communities in Vermont